This is a list of lieutenant generals in the United States Marine Corps from 2000 to 2009. The rank of lieutenant general (or three-star general) is the second-highest rank in the Marine Corps, and the first to have a specified number of appointments set by statute. It ranks above major general (two-star general) and below general (four-star general).

There have been 45 lieutenant generals in the United States Marine Corps from 2000 to 2009, 12 of whom were promoted to four-star general. All 45 achieved that rank while on active duty in the U.S. Marine Corps. Lieutenant generals entered the Marine Corps via several paths: 24 via Naval Reserve Officer Training Corps (NROTC) at a civilian university, 11 via Officer Candidate School (OCS), eight via the United States Naval Academy (USNA), and two via NROTC at a senior military college.

List of generals
Entries in the following list of lieutenant generals are indexed by the numerical order in which each officer was promoted to that rank while on active duty, or by an asterisk (*) if the officer did not serve in that rank while on active duty or was promoted to four-star rank while on active duty. Each entry lists the general's name, date of rank, active-duty positions held while serving at three-star rank, number of years of active-duty service at three-star rank (Yrs), year commissioned and source of commission, number of years in commission when promoted to three-star rank (YC), and other biographical notes.

Timeline

2000–2009

History

World War I

The rank of lieutenant general in the Marine Corps was first proposed in 1918, when the Senate Naval Affairs Committee tried to increase the rank of the major general commandant and his three senior staff officers for the duration of World War I. Instigated by the incumbent commandant, George Barnett, the proposal was blocked by Navy secretary Josephus Daniels and House Naval Affairs Committee member Thomas S. Butler, who was outraged that the headquarters staff would gain a lieutenant general commandant and three major generals at a time when no Marine major generals were deployed in the field. The incident contributed to Daniels' decision to remove Barnett midway through his second term as commandant.

A decade later, Butler himself tried to promote Barnett's successor as commandant, John A. Lejeune, to lieutenant general to match the three-star rank proposed for Army corps area commanders in 1928. The Navy had four admirals and three vice admirals, but the highest active-duty Army rank was only major general, so the War Department asked Congress to raise the ex officio ranks of the Army chief of staff and three overseas department commanders to general and nine corps area commanders to lieutenant general. At the President's behest, the House Military Affairs Committee approved only the four-star promotion for the chief of staff. Since the Army still had no lieutenant generals and Navy secretary Curtis D. Wilbur felt the commandant was not equivalent to a three-star fleet commander in the Navy, Lejeune's promotion died in committee.

In 1925, Congress authorized Marine Corps officers to retire with a tombstone promotion to the rank but not the retired pay of the next higher grade if they were specially commended for performance of duty in actual combat during World War I, but only if they retired because they were too old to be promoted further, a condition that excluded major generals, who already held the highest grade in the Marine Corps. Congress expanded eligibility in 1938 to cover officers with a qualifying combat citation from any time period who retired for any reason, allowing James C. Breckinridge to become the first three-star Marine when he retired with a tombstone promotion to lieutenant general in October 1941. Lejeune lobbied Congress to extend tombstone promotions to officers who had retired before 1938, and finally received his third star in April 1942.

World War II

In January 1942, following the United States entry into World War II, Congress increased the commandant's rank to lieutenant general, making Thomas Holcomb the first three-star Marine to serve on active duty. Holcomb's superior, chief of naval operations Ernest J. King, opposed promoting more Marines to that rank, but King relented after Alexander A. Vandegrift, recently awarded the Medal of Honor for the Battle of Guadalcanal, was assigned to command the first Marine amphibious corps and slated to succeed Holcomb as commandant. Vandegrift was appointed temporary lieutenant general in July 1943, under a 1941 law that anticipated the wartime expansion of the Marine Corps by authorizing an unlimited number of temporary general officers for the duration of the national emergency.

When Vandegrift returned to the United States to become commandant in January 1944, King rejected Holcomb's bid to maintain a three-star Marine in the Pacific theater by promoting the other amphibious corps commander, Holland M. Smith, who had led the ground forces at the Battle of Tarawa. Smith received his third star only after the naval commanders at Tarawa, Raymond A. Spruance and Richmond K. Turner, were rewarded with promotions in March 1944.

Unlike Holcomb, whose three-star rank was an aspect of his office of commandant, Vandegrift and Smith held personal three-star grades that followed them regardless of assignment, as did every other temporary lieutenant general appointed before the Officer Personnel Act of 1947 made all three-star ranks ex officio. For example, upon relinquishing his final command in May 1946, Smith remained a lieutenant general for the three months until he actually retired, whereas a postwar lieutenant general would have reverted immediately to his permanent two-star grade. Early promotions to these wartime grades therefore rewarded past personal triumphs—Guadalcanal for Vandegrift and Tarawa for Smith—as much as future organizational efficiency.

By the end of the war, the commandant was a full general. One lieutenant general commanded Marines deployed overseas under Fleet Marine Force, Pacific, and a second lieutenant general commanded Marines being readied for deployment under Marine Training and Replacement Command. A third lieutenant general was appointed in January 1947 to command the new Fleet Marine Force, Atlantic.

Postwar

The Officer Personnel Act of 1947 authorized only two lieutenant generals for the Marine Corps after July 1, 1948, except during war or national emergency. All active-duty ranks above major general were temporary and ex officio, so upon vacating an office carrying three-star rank, an officer reverted to his permanent two-star grade unless he retired. The two lieutenant generals were assigned to command the operating forces in the Pacific and Atlantic.

The permanent peacetime limit of two lieutenant generals was imposed during the post-World War II drawdown, but remained in place even as the Marine Corps expanded during the Cold War. The state of emergency declared for the Korean War on December 16, 1950, allowed a third lieutenant general to serve as assistant commandant and chief of staff of the Marine Corps, and a fourth as commandant of Marine Corps Schools. A fifth lieutenant general was assigned to Headquarters Marine Corps as director of aviation in 1953, but its three-star designation shifted to the chief of staff when that job was separated from assistant commandant in 1957.

Congress finally declared in 1977 that up to 15 percent of all active-duty Marine Corps general officers could be lieutenant generals or generals even without an emergency, after the 1976 National Emergencies Act terminated all existing national emergencies, effective September 14, 1978, which would have eliminated five of the seven lieutenant generals then on active duty.

Tombstone promotions

From 1938 to 1959, Marine officers who were specially commended for the performance of duty in actual combat before the end of World War II could retire with the rank but not the pay of the next higher grade. Such honorary increases in rank at retirement were called tombstone promotions, since their only tangible benefit was the right to carve the higher rank on one's tombstone. Tombstone promotions made James C. Breckinridge the first three-star Marine in October 1941, and Thomas Holcomb the first four-star Marine in January 1944.

A lieutenant general could only receive a tombstone promotion to four-star general if he still held a three-star job on the day he retired. When Oliver P. Smith was abruptly ordered to relinquish his three-star command on September 1, 1955, and revert to major general for the two months until his statutory retirement, he moved up his retirement date to September 1 and kept his tombstone promotion to general.

Of the 27 lieutenant generals appointed before Congress ended tombstone promotions on November 1, 1959, all but five were promoted to general, either by tombstone promotion, selection as commandant, or posthumous legislation, in the case of Roy S. Geiger, who died only a week before he was scheduled to retire with a tombstone promotion. The exceptions were Keller E. Rockey and Robert H. Pepper, who preferred to revert to major general rather than retire at the end of their three-star assignments; Thomas E. Watson, who relinquished command of Fleet Marine Force, Pacific for an assignment at Headquarters Marine Corps, but retired for ill health only three months later; Merwin H. Silverthorn, who was too young to retire for age when his three-star assignment ended and Congress had suspended early retirements; and Verne J. McCaul, who chose to sacrifice a fourth star to stay on active duty until the new commandant took office two months after tombstone promotions ended.

Commandant successions

Lieutenant general appointments were inextricably tied to the politics of commandant succession. Any lieutenant general was a viable candidate for commandant if he was young enough to complete a full four-year term before reaching the statutory retirement age of 62, as were prominent major generals.

A commandant tended to appoint lieutenant generals in two waves, one at the start of his term and one in the middle. The first wave filled three-star positions vacated by the newly appointed commandant and any rivals who chose to retire after being passed over. For example, Allen H. Turnage retired after a major general, Clifton B. Cates, was selected to be commandant in 1947, as did all five lieutenant generals after another major general, David M. Shoup, was selected in 1959. An incoming commandant might also choose not to retain his predecessor's lieutenant generals, to clear space for his own favorites. Of the five lieutenant generals who retired at Shoup's accession, at least two, Verne J. McCaul and Robert E. Hogaboom, only did so after he made clear they would not be continued at that rank. Upon succeeding Cates in 1952, Lemuel C. Shepherd Jr. promptly appointed Gerald C. Thomas to be his assistant commandant and chief of staff, sending Cates' appointee, Merwin H. Silverthorn, to a two-star job until retirement.

From the middle of his term, a commandant's choices for lieutenant general were meant to set up his preferred candidates to succeed him and eliminate others from consideration. When picking a commandant in 1947, President Harry S. Truman judged Cates and Shepherd to be equally qualified. Since Cates was senior, Truman appointed Cates first and promised to appoint Shepherd next. Cates duly appointed Shepherd to the next three-star vacancy, but when Oliver P. Smith returned to the United States in 1951 after famously commanding the 1st Marine Division at the Battle of Chosin Reservoir, Cates gave Smith another two-star command instead of the three-star promotion many expected, reducing the risk that Smith's popularity might derail Shepherd's succession. Smith finally received his third star two years later, after he was too old to be considered for commandant.

When Cates stepped down as commandant, he had to stay on active duty because a 1951 law froze voluntary officer retirements by withholding retired pay from any regular officer who retired for any reason other than age, disability, hardship, or the best interests of the service. (When Graves B. Erskine retired early to accept a civilian position in the Department of Defense in 1953, Congress had to pass special legislation to exempt him.) At Cates' request, Shepherd gave him the three-star job commanding Marine Corps Schools, repaying his support for Shepherd's succession. Congress repealed the law in 1954 and Cates retired two months later. Shepherd picked Thomas to succeed Cates, which simultaneously avoided creating another rival for the commandancy, since Thomas was too old to be considered, and freed Thomas' three-star job of assistant commandant and chief of staff for Shepherd's preferred candidate, Randolph M. Pate, who eventually did succeed Shepherd.

All such machinations failed when Pate's successor was selected in 1959. The best positioned three-star candidate, Merrill B. Twining, was viewed as too political by the secretary of defense, Thomas S. Gates Jr., who passed over all five lieutenant generals to recommend Shoup instead. Four of the five lieutenant generals collected tombstone promotions to general by retiring on November 1, 1959, the day the tombstone promotion law expired, but Verne J. McCaul chose to remain on duty until Shoup took office on January 1, 1960.

Legislative history

The following list of Congressional legislation includes all acts of Congress pertaining to appointments to the grade of lieutenant general in the United States Marine Corps from 2000 to 2009.

Each entry lists an act of Congress, its citation in the United States Statutes at Large, and a summary of the act's relevance, with officers affected by the act bracketed where applicable. Positions listed without reference to rank are assumed to be eligible for officers of three-star grade or higher.

See also
 Lieutenant general (United States)
 General officers in the United States
 List of active duty United States four-star officers
 List of active duty United States three-star officers
 List of United States Marine Corps four-star generals
 List of United States Marine Corps lieutenant generals on active duty before 1960
 List of United States Marine Corps lieutenant generals since 2010
 List of United States military leaders by rank
 Staff (military)

References

Notes

Three-star officers
Lists of American military personnel
United States Marine Corps
United States Marine Corps lists
United States Marine Corps generals